Walter Bruch (2 March 1908 – 5 May 1990) was a German electrical engineer and pioneer of German television. He was the inventor of Closed-circuit television. He invented the PAL colour television system at Telefunken in the early 1960s. In addition to his research activities Walter Bruch was an honorary lecturer at Hannover Technical University. He was awarded the Werner von Siemens Ring in 1975.

Biography 
He was born in Neustadt an der Weinstraße in the German Empire. At his father's request he attended a business school, but then trained as a machinist apprenticeship in a shoe factory. From 1928 he attended the university of applied science Hochschule Mittweida in Saxony. After that, he was a guest student at the Technical University of Berlin, where he met Manfred von Ardenne and the Hungarian inventor Dénes von Mihály.

From the early 1930s Bruch was involved in the development of television technology: in 1933 he presented a "people's television receiver" with a self-built telecine. In 1935 he started work as a technician in the Television and Physics research Department of Telefunken which was headed by Professor  and where  developed a special television camera for the 1936 Summer Olympics. One year later, at the Paris International Exposition, he introduced an iconoscope television unit that he had designed. During World War II he operated a closed-circuit television system installed at the Peenemünde launch site, so that the V-2 rocket launches could be watched at a safe distance from a bunker.

In 1950, Telefunken commissioned him to develop the first post-war television receivers. Some time later, he returned to physics research and later colour television. He studied and thoroughly tested the American NTSC system and what would later become the French SECAM system. His work led him and co-workers like  and Dr. Kruse to devise a new colour television system that automatically corrected for the differential phase distortion that can occur along the transmission channel.

On 3 January 1963, he gave the first public presentation of the Phase Alternation Line System to a group of experts from the European Broadcasting Union in Hannover. This is considered to be the date of birth of the PAL-Telefunken system, which was later adopted by more than thirty countries (at present, more than one hundred). When interviewed by German talk show host Hans Rosenthal on why he had named it the "PAL system", Bruch replied that certainly no German would want to have a "Bruch-System" had his family name been used as the eponym; Bruch in German is synonymous with "broken".

He received the David Sarnoff Medal from the Society of Motion Picture and Television Engineers in 1971 and the Eduard Rhein Ring of Honor from the German Eduard Rhein Foundation in 1981. He died in Hanover, aged 82.

Awards 
 1967: Order of Merit of the Federal Republic of Germany; Knight Commander's Cross with star
 1968: Goldene Kamera 1967 (Golden Camera 1967)
 1973: Culture Award, German Society for Photography
 1975: Werner von Siemens Ring
 1979: Decoration of Honour for Services to the Republic of Austria; Grand Decoration of Honour in Gold
 1982: Niedersächsischer Staatspreis (Lower Saxony State Prize), for Science
 1986: Bavarian Maximilian Order for Science and Art

References

External links 

 45 Years Anniversary of Walter Bruch's PAL Color Television
 Hochschule Mittweida: Walter Bruch 

1908 births
1990 deaths
Engineers from Rhineland-Palatinate
German electronics engineers
Television pioneers
20th-century German inventors
Werner von Siemens Ring laureates
People from Neustadt an der Weinstraße
People from the Palatinate (region)
Knights Commander of the Order of Merit of the Federal Republic of Germany